Stanley Cox may refer to:

Stanley Cox (footballer), Australian rules footballer
Stanley C. Cox (1883–1942), American physician

See Also
Stan Cox (1918–2012), British athlete